A list of films produced by the Tollywood (Bengali language film industry) based in Kolkata in the year 1933.

A-Z of films

Notes

References
Bengali Film Directory – edited by Ansu Sur, Nandan, Calcutta, 1999

External links
 Tollywood films of 1933 at the Internet Movie Database
Tollywood films of 1933 at gomolo.in

1933
Lists of 1933 films by country or language
Films, Bengali
Articles containing video clips